Buol (also, Bwool, Boeol) is a town and the administrative centre of the Regency of Buol, in Central Sulawesi Province of Indonesia.

Climate
Buol has a tropical rainforest climate (Af) with moderate rainfall from August to October and heavy rainfall in the remaining months.

References

Populated places in Central Sulawesi
Regency seats of Central Sulawesi